Quisinostat (USAN; development code JNJ-26481585) is an experimental drug candidate for the treatment of cancer.  It is a "second generation" histone deacetylase inhibitor with antineoplastic activity. It is highly potent against class I and II HDACs.


History 
It was developed by Janssen Pharmaceuticals and licensed to NewVac LLC.

Preclinical studies show that quisinostat amplifies HDAC-repressed expression of E-cadherin, leading to a reversal of epithelial to mesenchymal transition in tumor cells.

Clinical trials
Results of a phase I trials in patients with multiple myeloma in combination with bortezomib and dexamethasone were published in 2016.

References 

Experimental cancer drugs
Antineoplastic drugs
Pyrimidines
Indoles
Hydroxamic acids
Piperidines
Johnson & Johnson brands